Quake is a first-person shooter game developed by id Software and published by GT Interactive. The first game in the Quake series, it was originally released for MS-DOS, Microsoft Windows and Linux in 1996, followed by Mac OS and Sega Saturn in 1997 and Nintendo 64 in 1998. In the game, players must find their way through various maze-like, medieval environments while battling monsters using an array of weaponry. The overall atmosphere is dark and gritty, with many stone textures and a rusty, capitalized font. Quake takes inspiration from gothic fiction and the works of H. P. Lovecraft.

The successor to id Software's Doom series, Quake built upon the technology and gameplay of its predecessor. Unlike the Doom engine before it, the Quake engine offered full real-time 3D rendering and had early support for 3D acceleration through OpenGL. After Doom helped popularize multiplayer deathmatches, Quake added various multiplayer options. Online multiplayer became increasingly common, with the QuakeWorld update and software such as QuakeSpy making the process of finding and playing against others on the Internet easier and more reliable. Quake featured music composed by Trent Reznor and his band Nine Inch Nails.

Despite receiving critical acclaim, Quake's development was controversial in the history of id Software. Due to creative differences and a lack of leadership, the majority of the team left the company after the game's release, including co-founder John Romero. A remastered version of Quake was developed by Nightdive Studios and published by Bethesda Softworks and was released for Microsoft Windows, Nintendo Switch, PlayStation 4, and Xbox One consoles in August 2021, including the original game's extended content and two episodes developed by MachineGames. The PlayStation 5 and Xbox Series X/S versions were released in October 2021.

Gameplay

In Quake single-player mode, players explore levels, facing monsters and finding secret areas before reaching an exit. Switches or keys open doors, and reaching the exit takes the player to the next level. Before accessing an episode, there is a set of three pathways with easy, medium, and hard skill levels. The fourth skill level, "Nightmare", was "so bad that it was hidden, so people won't wander in by accident"; the player must drop through water before the episode four entrance and go into a secret passage to access it.

Quake single-player campaign is organized into four individual episodes with seven to eight levels in each (including one secret level per episode, one of which is a "low gravity" level that challenges the player's abilities in a different way). If the player's character dies, they must restart at the beginning of that level. The game may be saved at any time in the PC versions and between levels in the console versions. Upon completing an episode, the player is returned to the hub "START" level, where another episode can be chosen. Each episode starts the player from scratch, without any previously collected items. Episode one (which formed the shareware or downloadable demo version of Quake) has the most traditional ideology of a boss in the last level. The ultimate objective at the end of each episode is to recover a magic rune. After all of the runes are collected, the floor of the hub level opens up to reveal an entrance to the "END" level which contains a final puzzle.

Multiplayer
In multiplayer mode, players on several computers connect to a server (which may be a dedicated machine or on one of the player's computers), where they can either play the single-player campaign together in co-op (cooperative) mode, or play against each other in multiplayer. When players die in multiplayer mode, they can immediately respawn, but will lose any items that were collected. Similarly, items that have been picked up previously respawn after some time, and may be picked up again. The most popular multiplayer modes are all forms of deathmatch. Deathmatch modes typically consist of either free-for-all (no organization or teams involved), one-on-one duels, or organized teamplay with two or more players per team (or clan). Players frequently implement mods during teamplay. Monsters are not normally present in teamplay, as they serve no purpose other than to get in the way and reveal the positions of the players.

The gameplay in Quake was considered unique for its time because of the different ways the player can maneuver through the game. Bunny hopping or strafe jumping allow faster movement, while rocket jumping enables the player to reach otherwise-inaccessible areas at the cost of some self-damage. The player can start and stop moving suddenly, jump unnaturally high, and change direction while moving through the air. Many of these non-realistic behaviors contribute to Quakes appeal. Multiplayer Quake was one of the first games singled out as a form of electronic sport. A notable participant was Dennis Fong, who won John Carmack's Ferrari 328 at the Microsoft-sponsored Red Annihilation tournament in 1997.

Plot
In the single-player game, the player takes the role of the unnamed protagonist, named Ranger in later games (voiced by Trent Reznor), sent into a portal in order to stop an enemy code-named "Quake". The government had been experimenting with teleportation technology and developed a working prototype called a "Slipgate"; the mysterious Quake compromised the Slipgate by connecting it with its own teleportation system, using it to send death squads to the "Human" dimension in order to test the martial capabilities of humanity.

The sole surviving protagonist in "Operation Counterstrike" is Ranger, who must advance, starting each of the four episodes from an overrun human military base, before fighting his way into other dimensions, reaching them via the Slipgate or their otherworld equivalent. After passing through the Slipgate, Ranger's main objective is to collect four magic runes from four dimensions of Quake; these are the key to stopping the enemy and ending the invasion of Earth.

The single-player campaign consists of 30 separate levels, or "maps", divided into four episodes (with a total of 26 regular maps and four secret ones), as well as a hub level to select a difficulty setting and episode, and the game's final boss level. Each episode represents individual dimensions that the player can access through magical portals (as opposed to the technological Slipgate) that are discovered over the course of the game. The various realms consist of a number of gothic, medieval, and lava-filled caves and dungeons, with a recurring theme of hellish and satanic imagery reminiscent of Doom (such as pentagrams and images of demons on the walls). The game's setting is inspired by dark fantasy influences, including H. P. Lovecraft's Cthulhu Mythos. Dimensional Shamblers appear as enemies, the "Spawn" enemies are called "Formless Spawn of Tsathoggua" in the manual, the boss of the first episode is named Chthon, the main villain is named Shub-Niggurath and is explicitly stated to be an Old One, and the four episodes all have Lovecraftian names.

Development

A preview included with id's very first release, 1990's Commander Keen, advertised a game entitled The Fight for Justice as a follow-up to the Commander Keen trilogy. It would feature a character named Quake, "the strongest, most dangerous person on the continent", armed with thunderbolts and a "Ring of Regeneration". Conceived as a VGA full-color side-scrolling role-playing game, The Fight for Justice was never released.

Lead designer and director John Romero later conceived of Quake as an action game taking place in a fully 3D world, inspired by Sega AM2's 3D fighting game Virtua Fighter. Quake was also intended to feature Virtua Fighter influenced third-person melee combat, but id Software considered it to be risky. Because the project was taking too long, the third-person melee was eventually dropped. This led to creative differences between Romero and id Software, and eventually his departure from the company after Quake was released. Even though he led the project, Romero did not receive any money from Quake. In 2000, Romero released Daikatana, the game that he envisioned Quake being, and despite its shaky development, and being considered one of the worst games of all time, he said Daikatana was "more fun to make than Quake" due to the lack of creative interference.

Quake was given as a title to the game that id Software was working on shortly after the release of Doom II. The earliest information released described Quake as focusing on a Thor-like character who wields a giant hammer, and is able to knock away enemies by throwing the hammer (complete with real-time inverse kinematics). Initially, the levels were supposed to be designed in an Aztec style, but the choice was dropped some months into the project. Early screenshots then showed medieval environments and dragons. The plan was for the game to have more RPG-style elements. However, work was very slow on the engine, since John Carmack, the main programmer of Quake, was not only developing a fully 3D engine, but also a TCP/IP networking model (Carmack later said that he should have done two separate projects which developed those things). Working with a game engine that was still in development presented difficulties for the designers.

Eventually, the whole id Software team began to think that the original concept may not have been as wise a choice as they first believed. Thus, the final game was very stripped down from its original intentions, and instead featured gameplay similar to Doom and its sequel, although the levels and enemies were closer to medieval RPG style rather than science-fiction. In a December 1, 1994, post to an online bulletin board, John Romero wrote, "Okay, people. It seems that everyone is speculating on whether Quake is going to be a slow, RPG-style light-action game. Wrong! What does id do best and dominate at? Can you say "action"? I knew you could. Quake will be constant, hectic action throughout – probably more so than Doom".

Quake was programmed by John Carmack, Michael Abrash, and John Cash. The levels and scenarios were designed by American McGee, Sandy Petersen, John Romero, and Tim Willits, and the graphics were designed by Adrian Carmack, Kevin Cloud and Paul Steed. Cloud created the monster and player graphics using Alias.

The game engine developed for Quake, the Quake engine, popularized several major advances in the first-person shooter genre: polygonal models instead of prerendered sprites; full 3D level design instead of a 2.5D map; prerendered lightmaps; and allowing end users to partially program the game (in this case with QuakeC), which popularized fan-created modifications (mods).

Before the release of the full game or the shareware version of Quake, id Software released QTest on February 24, 1996. It was described as a technology demo and was limited to three multiplayer maps. There was no single-player support and some of the gameplay and graphics were unfinished or different from their final versions. QTest gave gamers their first peek into the filesystem and modifiability of the Quake engine, and many entity mods (that placed monsters in the otherwise empty multiplayer maps) and custom player skins began appearing online before the full game was even released.

Initially, the game was designed so that when the player ran out of ammunition, the player character would hit enemies with a gun-butt. Shortly before release this was replaced with an axe.

The release of Quake marks the end of the classic lineup at id Software. Due to conflicts with game design and ideas, animosity grew during development that majority of the staff resigned from id after the game's release including Romero, Abrash, Shawn Green, Jay Wilbur, Petersen and Mike Wilson. Petersen claimed in July 2021 that the lack of a team leader was the cause of it all. He volunteered to take lead as he had five years of experience as project manager in MicroProse, but he was turned down by Carmack.

Music and sound design 

Quakes music and sound design was done by Trent Reznor and Nine Inch Nails, using ambient soundscapes and synthesized drones to create atmospheric tracks. In an interview, Reznor remarked that the Quake soundtrack "is not music, it's textures and ambiences and whirling machine noises and stuff. We tried to make the most sinister, depressive, scary, frightening kind of thing... It's been fun." The game includes an homage to Reznor in the form of ammo boxes for the "Nailgun" and "Super Nailgun" decorated with the Nine Inch Nails logo.

Some digital re-releases of the game lack the CD soundtrack that came with the original shareware release. The 2021 remastered version includes the soundtrack.

Ports
The first port to be completed was the Linux port Quake 0.91 by id Software employee Dave D. Taylor using X11 on July 5, 1996, followed by a SPARC Solaris port later that year also by Taylor. An SVGAlib port for Linux was created by programmer Greg Alexander in 1997 using leaked source code but was later mainlined by id, unlike similar unofficial ports for OS/2, Amiga, Java VMs, and Mac OS. The first commercially released port was for Mac OS, done by MacSoft and Lion Entertainment, Inc. (the latter company ceased to exist just prior to the port's release, leading to MacSoft's involvement) in late August 1997. ClickBOOM announced version for Amiga-computers in 1998. Finally in 1999, a retail version of the Linux port was distributed by Macmillan Digital Publishing USA in a bundle with the three add-ons as Quake: The Offering.

Quake was also ported to home console systems. On December 2, 1997, the game was released for the Sega Saturn. Initially GT Interactive was to publish this version itself, but it later cancelled the release and the Saturn rights were picked up by Sega. Sega then took the project away from the original development team, who had been encountering difficulties getting the port to run at a decent frame rate, and assigned it to Lobotomy Software. The Saturn port uses Lobotomy Software 3D engine, SlaveDriver (also used in PowerSlave and Duke Nukem 3D for the Saturn). It is the only version of Quake rated "T" for Teen instead of "M" for Mature.

Quake was also ported to the Sony PlayStation by Lobotomy Software, but the company was not able to find a publisher for it. A port for the Atari Jaguar was reported as 30% complete in a May 1996 issue of Ultimate Future Games magazine, but it was never released. A port of Quake was planned for Panasonic M2 prior to cancellation of the system.

On March 24, 1998, the game was released for the Nintendo 64 by Midway Games. This version was developed by the same programming team that worked on Doom 64, at id Software's request. The Nintendo 64 version was originally slated to be released in 1997, but Midway delayed it until March 1998 to give the team time to implement the deathmatch modes.

Both console ports required compromises because of the limited CPU power and ROM storage space for levels. For example, the levels were rebuilt in the Saturn version in order to simplify the architecture, thereby reducing demands on the CPU. The Saturn version includes 28 of the 32 single-player levels from the original PC version of the game, though the secret levels, Ziggurat Vertigo (E1M8), The Underearth (E2M7), The Haunted Halls (E3M7), and The Nameless City (E4M8), were removed. Instead, it has four exclusive secret levels: Purgatorium, Hell's Aerie, The Coliseum, and Watery Grave. It also contains an exclusive unlockable, "Dank & Scuz", which is a story set in the Quake milieu and presented in the form of a slide show with voice acting. There are no multiplayer modes in the Saturn version; as a result of this, all of the deathmatch maps from the PC version were removed from the Saturn port. The Nintendo 64 version includes 25 single-player levels from the PC version, though it is missing The Grisly Grotto (E1M4), The Installation (E2M1), The Ebon Fortress (E2M4), The Wind Tunnels (E3M5), The Sewage System (E4M1), and Hell's Atrium (E4M5) levels. It also does not use the hub "START" map where the player chooses a difficulty level and an episode; the difficulty level is chosen from a menu when starting the game, and all of the levels are played in sequential order from The Slipgate Complex (E1M1) to Shub Niggurath's Pit (END). The Nintendo 64 version, while lacking the cooperative multiplayer mode, includes two player deathmatch. All six of the deathmatch maps from the PC version are in the Nintendo 64 port, and an exclusive deathmatch level, The Court of Death, is also included.

An unreleased Game Boy Advance port of Quake was in development from Randy Linden in 2002, and was pitched to id Software in that year. The port was rejected by the company, and Linden's work would remain unused until prototypes of his work were dumped in June 2022. Two homebrew ports of Quake for the Nintendo DS exist, QuakeDS and CQuake. Both run well; however, multiplayer does not work on QuakeDS. Since the source code for Quake was released, a number of unofficial ports have been made available for PDAs and mobile phones, such as PocketQuake, as well as versions for the Symbian S60 series of mobile phones and Android mobile phones. The Rockbox project also distributes a version of Quake that runs on some MP3 players.

In 2005, id Software signed a deal with publisher Pulse Interactive to release a version of Quake for mobile phones. The game was engineered by Californian company Bear Naked Productions. Initially due to be released on only two mobile phones, the Samsung Nexus (for which it was to be an embedded game) and the LG VX360. Quake mobile was reviewed by GameSpot on the Samsung Nexus and they cited its US release as October 2005; they also gave it a "Best Mobile Game" in their E3 2005 Editor's Choice Awards. It is unclear as to whether the game actually did ship with the Samsung Nexus. The game is only available for the DELL x50v and x51v, both of which are PDAs, not mobile phones. Quake Mobile does not feature the Nine Inch Nails soundtrack due to space constraints. Quake Mobile runs the most recent version of GL Quake (Quake v.1.09 GL 1.00) at 800x600 resolution and 25 fps. The most recent version of Quake Mobile is v.1.20 which has stylus support. There was an earlier version v.1.19 which lacked stylus support. The two Quake expansion packs, Scourge of Armagon and Dissolution of Eternity, are also available for Quake Mobile.

A Flash-based version of the game by Michael Rennie runs Quake at full speed in any Flash-enabled web browser. Based on the shareware version of the game, it includes only the first episode and is available for free on the web.

Mods and add-ons
Quake can be heavily modified by altering the graphics, audio, or scripting in QuakeC, and has been the focus of many fan created "mods". The first mods were small gameplay fixes and patches initiated by the community, usually enhancements to weapons or gameplay with new enemies. Later mods were more ambitious and resulted in Quake fans creating versions of the game that were drastically different from id Software's original release.

The first major Quake mod was Team Fortress. This mod consists of Capture the Flag gameplay with a class system for the players. Players choose a class, which creates various restrictions on weapons and armor types available to that player, and also grants special abilities. For example, the bread-and-butter Soldier class has medium armor, medium speed, and a well-rounded selection of weapons and grenades, while the Scout class is lightly armored, very fast, has a scanner that detects nearby enemies, but has very weak offensive weapons. One of the other differences with CTF is the fact that the flag is not returned automatically when a player drops it: running over one's flag in Threewave CTF would return the flag to the base, and in TF the flag remains in the same spot for preconfigured time and it has to be defended on remote locations. This caused a shift in defensive tactics compared to Threewave CTF. Team Fortress maintained its standing as the most-played online Quake modification for many years. Team Fortress would go on to become Team Fortress Classic and get a sequel, Team Fortress 2.

Another popular mod was Threewave Capture the Flag (CTF), primarily authored by Dave 'Zoid' Kirsch. Threewave CTF is a partial conversion consisting of new levels, a new weapon (a grappling hook), power-ups, new textures, and new gameplay rules. Typically, two teams (red and blue) would compete in a game of Capture the flag, though a few maps with up to four teams (red, blue, green, and yellow) were created. Capture the Flag soon became a standard game mode included in most popular multiplayer games released after Quake. Rocket Arena provides the ability for players to face each other in small, open arenas with changes in the gameplay rules so that item collection and detailed level knowledge are no longer factors. A series of short rounds, with the surviving player in each round gaining a point, instead tests the player's aiming and dodging skills and reflexes. Clan Arena is a further modification that provides team play using Rocket Arena rules. One mod category, "bots", was introduced to provide surrogate players in multiplayer mode.

Arcane Dimensions is a singleplayer mod. It's a partial conversion with breakable objects and walls, enhanced particle system, numerous visual improvements and new enemies and weapons. The level design is much more complex in terms of geometry and gameplay than in the original game.

There are a large number of custom levels that have been made by users and fans of Quake. , new maps are still being made, over twenty years since the game's release. Custom maps are new maps that are playable by loading them into the original game. Custom levels of various gameplay types have been made, but most are in the single-player and deathmatch genres. More than 1500 single-player and a similar number of deathmatch maps have been made for Quake.

Reception

Sales
According to David Kushner in Masters of Doom, id Software released a retail shareware version of Quake before the game's full retail distribution by GT Interactive. These shareware copies could be converted into complete versions through passwords purchased via phone. However, Kushner wrote that "gamers wasted no time hacking the shareware to unlock the full version of the game for free." This problem, combined with the scale of the operation, led id Software to cancel the plan. As a result, the company was left with 150,000 unsold shareware copies in storage. The venture damaged Quakes initial sales and caused its retail push by GT Interactive to miss the holiday shopping season. Following the game's full release, Kushner remarked that its early "sales were good — with 250,000 units shipped — but not a phenomenon like Doom II."

In the United States, Quake placed sixth on PC Data's monthly computer game sales charts for November and December 1996. Its shareware edition was the sixth-best-selling computer game of 1996 overall, while its retail SKU claimed 20th place. The shareware version sold 393,575 copies and grossed $3,005,519 in the United States during 1996. It remained in PC Data's monthly top 10 from January to April 1997, but was absent by May. During its first 12 months, Quake sold 373,000 retail copies and earned $18 million in the United States, according to PC Data. Its final retail sales for 1997 were 273,936 copies, which made it the country's 16th-highest computer game seller for the year.

Sales of Quake reached 550,000 units in the United States alone by December 1999. In 1997, id estimated that there may be as many as 5 million copies of Quake circulating. The game sold over 1.4 million copies by December 1997.

Critical reviews

Quake was critically acclaimed on the PC. Aggregating review websites GameRankings and Metacritic gave the original PC version 93% and 94/100, and the Nintendo 64 port 76% and 74/100. A Next Generation critic lauded the game's realistic 3D physics and genuinely unnerving sound effects. GamePro said Quake had been over-hyped but is excellent nonetheless, particularly its usage of its advanced 3D engine. The review also praised the sound effects, atmospheric music, and graphics, though it criticized that the polygons used to construct the enemies are too obvious at close range.

Less than a month after Quake was released (and a month before they actually reviewed the game), Next Generation listed it as number 9 on their "Top 100 Games of All Time", saying that it is similar to Doom but supports a maximum of eight players instead of four. In 1996, Computer Gaming World declared Quake the 36th-best computer game ever released, and listed "telefragged" as #1 on its list of "the 15 best ways to die in computer gaming". In 1997, the Game Developers Choice Awards gave Quake three spotlight awards for Best Sound Effects, Best Music or Soundtrack and Best On-Line/Internet Game.

Entertainment Weekly gave the game a B+ and called it "an extended bit of subterranean mayhem that offers three major improvements over its immediate predecessor [Doom]." He identified these as the graphics, the audio design, and the amount of violent action.

Next Generation reviewed the Macintosh version of the game, rating it four stars out of five, and stated that "Though replay value is limited by the lack of interactive environments or even the semblance of a plot, there's no doubt that Quake and its engine are something powerful and addictive."

The Saturn version received mostly negative reviews, as critics generally agreed that it did not bring over the elements that make the game enjoyable. In particular, critics reviled the absence of the multiplayer mode, which they felt had eclipsed the single player campaign as the reason to play Quake. Kraig Kujawa wrote in Electronic Gaming Monthly, "Quake is not a great one-player game - it gained its notoriety on the Net as a multiplayer." and his co-reviewer Sushi-X concluded "Without multiplayer, I'd pass." Most reviews also said the controls are much worse than the PC original, in particular the difficulty of aiming at enemies without the benefit of either mouse-controlled camera or a second analog stick. GamePro noted that the graphics are very pixelated and blurry, to the point where people unfamiliar with Quake would not be able to discern what they're looking at. They concluded, "Quake may not be the worst Saturn game available, but it certainly doesn't live up to its PC heritage." Most critics did find the port technically impressive, particularly the added light sourcing. However, Next Generation pointed out that "Porting Quake to a console is nothing more than an excuse for bragging rights. It's simply a way to show that the limited architecture of a 32-bit system has the power to push the same game that those mighty Pentium PCs take for granted." Even Rich Leadbetter of Sega Saturn Magazine, which gave the port a 92%, acknowledged that it was a proverbial dancing bear, noting several conspicuous compromises the port made and stating as his concluding argument, "Look, it's Quake on the Saturn - the machine has no right to be doing this!" GameSpot opined that the game's lack of plot makes the single-player campaign feel too shallow and lacking in motivation to appeal to most gamers. Most critics compared the port unfavorably to the Saturn version of Duke Nukem 3D (which came out just a few months earlier), mainly in terms of gameplay.

Reviews for the Nintendo 64 version praised its lighting effects and smooth frame rate in single-player mode. IGN added the caveats that the environments are simplified from the PC version and the pre-rendered light sourcing is less impressive than the real-time light sourcing of the Saturn version, but judged the visuals overall to be superior to those of the unaccelerated PC version. GamePro went so far as to say the graphics are as clean as those of GL Quake, while Next Generation was more moderate, concluding that "As a whole, Quake 64 doesn't live up to the experience offered by the high-end, 3D-accelerated PC version; it is, however, an entertaining gaming experience that is worthy of a close look and a nice addition to the blossoming number of first-person shooters for Nintendo 64." Most reviews found fault with the multiplayer, stating that the frame rate takes a hit in this mode, some of the levels are too large with only two players present, and the game should have supported four players, as previous Nintendo 64 shooters Hexen: Beyond Heretic and GoldenEye 007 did. However, Next Generation pointed out that due to the lack of a link cable for the Nintendo 64, Quake with four players would inevitably have meant a severely compromised frame rate and small view screen. GameSpot also felt the multiplayer was fun despite its limitations, and noted that setting up a deathmatch was quicker and easier on the Nintendo 64 than on PC. Reviewers sharply differed over the controls, with Electronic Gaming Monthly, IGN, and GamePro all describing them as precise, responsive, and intuitive, while GameSpot and Next Generation complained that finding the right control required fiddling with the settings and even at best felt lacking compared to a keyboard-and-mouse setup. Reviews generally concluded that while the Nintendo 64 version would not appeal to Quake veterans due to its multiplayer shortcomings and lack of exclusive content, it was a strong enough conversion for non-PC gamers to enjoy the Quake experience.

Next Generation reviewed the arcade version of the game, rating it three stars out of five, and stated that "For those who don't have LAN or internet capabilities, check out arcade Quake. It's a blast."

In 1998, PC Gamer declared it the 28th-best computer game ever released, and the editors called it "one of the most addictive, adaptable, and pulse-pounding 3D shooters ever created". In 2003, Quake was inducted into GameSpot's list of the greatest games of all time.

Remastered version

Nintendo Life gave the Switch version a rave review, saying it "wisely avoids tinkering with the magic formula that made the game so great in the first place, instead keeping the look and feel of the original intact whilst carefully adding all manner of modern bells and whistles in a feature-packed port that's an absolute dream to spend time with." They particularly praised the level designs, puzzle elements, atmospheric game world, and numerous configuration options for the graphical upgrades and multiplayer sessions. They argued that the smooth performance in both docked and handheld mode and ability to play the game as portable makes the Switch version the definitive version of the game.

Speedruns
As an example of the dedication that Quake has inspired in its fan community, a group of expert players recorded speedrun demos (replayable recordings of the player's movement) of Quake levels completed in record time on the "Nightmare" skill level. The footage was edited into a continuous 19 minutes, 49 seconds demo called Quake done Quick and released on June 10, 1997. Owners of Quake could replay this demo in the game engine, watching the run unfold as if they were playing it themselves.

Most full-game speedruns are a collaborative effort by a number of runners (though some have been done by single runners on their own). Although each particular level is credited to one runner, the ideas and techniques used are iterative and collaborative in nature, with each runner picking up tips and ideas from the others, so that speeds keep improving beyond what was thought possible as the runs are further optimized and new tricks or routes are discovered. Further time improvements of the continuous whole game run were achieved into the 21st century. In addition, many thousands of individual level runs are kept at Speed Demos Archive's Quake section, including many on custom maps. Speedrunning is a counterpart to multiplayer modes in making Quake one of the first games promoted as a virtual sport.

Legacy
The source code of the Quake and QuakeWorld engines was licensed under the GNU GPL-2.0-or-later on December 21, 1999. The id Software maps, objects, textures, sounds, and other creative works remain under their original proprietary license. The shareware distribution of Quake is still freely redistributable and usable with the GPLed engine code. One must purchase a copy of Quake in order to receive the registered version of the game which includes more single-player episodes and the deathmatch maps. Based on the success of the first Quake game, and later published Quake II and Quake III Arena, Quake 4 was released in October 2005, developed by Raven Software using the Doom 3 engine.

Quake was the game primarily responsible for the emergence of the machinima artform of films made in game engines, thanks to edited Quake demos such as Ranger Gone Bad and Blahbalicious, the in-game film The Devil's Covenant, and the in-game-rendered, four-hour epic film The Seal of Nehahra. On June 22, 2006, it had been ten years since the original uploading of the game to cdrom.com archives. Many Internet forums had topics about it, and it was a front-page story on Slashdot. On October 11, 2006, John Romero released the original map files for all of the levels in Quake .

Quake has four sequels: Quake II, Quake III Arena, Quake 4, and Enemy Territory: Quake Wars. In 2002, a version of Quake was produced for mobile phones. A copy of Quake was also released as a compilation in 2001, labeled Ultimate Quake, which included the original Quake, Quake II, and Quake III Arena which was published by Activision. In 2008, Quake was honored at the 59th Annual Technology & Engineering Emmy Awards for advancing the art form of user modifiable games. John Carmack accepted the award. Years after its original release, Quake is still regarded by many critics as one of the greatest and most influential games ever made.

Expansions and ports
There were two official expansion packs released for Quake. The expansion packs pick up where the first game left off, include all of the same weapons, power-ups, monsters, and gothic atmosphere/architecture, and continue/finish the story of the first game and its protagonist. An unofficial third expansion pack, Abyss of Pandemonium, was developed by the Impel Development Team, published by Perfect Publishing, and released on April 14, 1998; an updated version, version 2.0, titled Abyss of Pandemonium – The Final Mission was released as freeware. An authorized expansion pack, Q!ZONE was developed and published by WizardWorks, and released in 1996. An authorized level editor, Deathmatch Maker was developed by Virtus Corporation and published by Macmillan Digital Publishing in 1997. It contained an exclusive Virtus' Episode. In honor of Quakes 20th anniversary, MachineGames, an internal development studio of ZeniMax Media, who are the current owners of the Quake IP, released online a new expansion pack for free, called Episode 5: Dimension of the Past.

Quake Mission Pack No. 1: Scourge of Armagon
Quake Mission Pack No. 1: Scourge of Armagon was the first official mission pack, released on March 5, 1997. Developed by Hipnotic Interactive, it features three episodes divided into seventeen new single-player levels (three of which are secret), a new multiplayer level, a new soundtrack composed by Jeehun Hwang, and gameplay features not originally present in Quake, including rotating structures and breakable walls. Unlike the main Quake game and Mission Pack No. 2, Scourge does away with the episode hub, requiring the three episodes to be played sequentially. The three new enemies include Centroids, large cybernetic scorpions with nailguns; Gremlins, small goblins that can steal weapons and multiply by feeding on enemy corpses; and Spike Mines, floating orbs that detonate when near the player. The three new weapons include the Mjolnir, a large lightning emitting hammer; the Laser Cannon, which shoots bouncing bolts of energy; and the Proximity Mine Launcher, which fires grenades that attach to surfaces and detonate when an opponent comes near. The three new power-ups include the Horn of Conjuring, which summons an enemy to protect the player; the Empathy Shield, which halves the damage taken by the player between the player and the attacking enemy; and the Wetsuit, which renders the player invulnerable to electricity and allows the player to stay underwater for a period of time. The storyline follows Armagon, a general of Quake's forces, planning to invade Earth via a portal known as the 'Rift'. Armagon resembles a giant gremlin with cybernetic legs and a combined rocket launcher/laser cannon for arms.

Tim Soete of GameSpot gave it a score 8.6 out of 10.

Quake Mission Pack No. 2: Dissolution of Eternity
Quake Mission Pack No. 2: Dissolution of Eternity was the second official mission pack, released on March 19, 1997. Developed by Rogue Entertainment, it features two episodes divided into fifteen new single-player levels, a new multiplayer level, a new soundtrack, and several new enemies and bosses. Notably, the pack lacks secret levels. The eight new enemies include Electric Eels, Phantom Swordsmen, Multi-Grenade Ogres (which fire cluster grenades), Hell Spawn, Wraths (floating, robed undead), Guardians (resurrected ancient Egyptian warriors), Mummies, and statues of various enemies that can come to life. The four new types of bosses include Lava Men, Overlords, large Wraths, and a dragon guarding the "temporal energy converter". The two new power-ups include the Anti Grav Belt, which allows the player to jump higher; and the Power Shield, which lowers the damage the player receives. Rather than offering new weapons, the mission pack gives the player four new types of ammo for existing weapons, such as "lava nails" for the Nailgun, cluster grenades for the Grenade Launcher, rockets that split into four in a horizontal line for the Rocket Launcher, and plasma cells for the Thunderbolt, as well as a grappling hook to help with moving around the levels.

Tim Soete of GameSpot gave it a score of 7.7 out of 10.

VQuake
In late 1996, id Software released VQuake, a port of the Quake engine to support hardware accelerated rendering on graphics cards using the Rendition Vérité chipset. Aside from the expected benefit of improved performance, VQuake offered numerous visual improvements over the original software-rendered Quake. It boasted full 16-bit color, bilinear filtering (reducing pixelation), improved dynamic lighting, optional anti-aliasing, and improved source code clarity, as the improved performance finally allowed the use of gotos to be abandoned in favor of proper loop constructs. As the name implied, VQuake was a proprietary port specifically for the Vérité; consumer 3D acceleration was in its infancy at the time, and there was no standard 3D API for the consumer market. After completing VQuake, John Carmack vowed to never write a proprietary port again, citing his frustration with Rendition's Speedy3D API.

QuakeWorld
To improve the quality of online play, id Software released QuakeWorld in December 1996, a build of Quake that featured significantly revamped network code including the addition of client-side prediction. The original Quake network code would not show the player the results of his actions until the server sent back a reply acknowledging them. For example, if the player attempted to move forward, his client would send the request to move forward to the server, and the server would determine whether the client was actually able to move forward or if he ran into an obstacle, such as a wall or another player. The server would then respond to the client, and only then would the client display movement to the player. This was fine for play on a LAN, a high bandwidth, very low latency connection, but the latency over a dial-up Internet connection is much larger than on a LAN, and this caused a noticeable delay between when a player tried to act and when that action was visible on the screen. This made gameplay much more difficult, especially since the unpredictable nature of the Internet made the amount of delay vary from moment to moment. Players would experience jerky, laggy motion that sometimes felt like ice skating, where they would slide around with seemingly no ability to stop, due to a build-up of previously-sent movement requests. John Carmack has admitted that this was a serious problem that should have been fixed before release, but it was not caught because he and other developers had high-speed Internet access at home.

After months of private beta testing, QuakeWorld, written by John Carmack with help from John Cash and Christian Antkow, was released on December 13, 1996. The client portion followed on December 17. Official id Software development stopped with the test release of QuakeWorld 2.33 on December 21, 1998. The last official stable release was 2.30. QuakeWorld has been described by IGN as the first popular online first-person shooter.

With the help of client-side prediction, which allowed players to see their own movement immediately without waiting for a response from the server, QuakeWorld network code allowed players with high-latency connections to control their character's movement almost as precisely as when playing in single-player mode. The Netcode parameters could be adjusted by the user so that QuakeWorld performed well for users with high and low latency. The trade off to client-side prediction was that sometimes other players or objects would no longer be quite where they had appeared to be, or, in extreme cases, that the player would be pulled back to a previous position when the client received a late reply from the server which overrode movement the client had already previewed; this was known as "warping". As a result, some serious players, particularly in the U.S., still preferred to play online using the original Quake engine (commonly called NetQuake) rather than QuakeWorld. However, the majority of players, especially those on dial-up connections, preferred the newer network model, and QuakeWorld soon became the dominant form of online play. Following the success of QuakeWorld, client-side prediction has become a standard feature of nearly all real-time online games. As with all other Quake upgrades, QuakeWorld was released as a free, unsupported add-on to the game and was updated numerous times through 1998.

GLQuake
On January 22, 1997, id Software released GLQuake. This was designed to use the OpenGL 3D API to access hardware 3D graphics acceleration cards to rasterize the graphics, rather than having the computer's CPU fill in every pixel. In addition to higher framerates for most players, GLQuake provided higher resolution modes and texture filtering. GLQuake also experimented with reflections, transparent water, and even rudimentary shadows. GLQuake came with a driver enabling the subset of OpenGL used by the game to function on the 3dfx Voodoo Graphics card, the only consumer-level card at the time capable of running GLQuake well. Previously, John Carmack had experimented with a version of Quake specifically written for the Rendition Vérité chip used in the Creative Labs PCI 3D Blaster card. This version had met with only limited success, and Carmack decided to write for generic APIs in the future rather than tailoring for specific hardware.

WinQuake
On March 11, 1997, id Software released WinQuake, a version of the non-OpenGL engine designed to run under Microsoft Windows; the original Quake had been written for DOS, allowing for launch from Windows 95, but could not run under Windows NT-based operating systems because it required direct access to hardware. WinQuake instead accessed hardware via Win32-based APIs such as DirectSound, DirectInput, and DirectDraw that were supported on Windows 95, Windows NT 4.0 and later releases. Like GLQuake, WinQuake also allowed higher resolution video modes. This removed the last barrier to widespread popularity of the game. In 1998, LBE Systems and Laser-Tron released Quake: Arcade Tournament Edition in the arcades in limited quantities.

Sequels
After the departure of Sandy Petersen, the remaining id employees chose to change the thematic direction substantially for Quake II, making the design more technological and futuristic, rather than maintaining the focus on Lovecraftian fantasy. Quake 4 followed the design themes of Quake II, whereas Quake III Arena mixed these styles; it had a parallel setting that housed several "id all-stars" from various games as playable characters. The mixed settings occurred because Quake II originally began as a separate product line. The id designers fell back on the project's nickname of "Quake II" because the game's fast-paced, tactile feel felt closer to a Quake game than a new franchise. Since any sequel to the original Quake had already been vetoed, it became a way of continuing the series without continuing the storyline or setting of the first game. In June 2011, John Carmack made an offhand comment that id Software was considering going back to the "...mixed up Cthulhu-ish Quake 1 world and rebooting [in] that direction."

Dimension of the Past
To celebrate Quakes 20th anniversary, a mission pack was developed by MachineGames and released on June 24, 2016. It features 10 new single-player levels and a new multiplayer level, but does not use new gameplay additions from Scourge of Armagon and Dissolution of Eternity. Chronologically, it is set between the main game and the expansions.

Vulkan rendering API
On July 20, 2016, Axel Gneiting, an id Tech employee responsible for implementing the Vulkan rendering path to the id Tech 6 engine used in Doom (2016), released a port called vkQuake under the GPLv2.

Remastered Edition and Dimension of the Machine
At the launch of the 2021 QuakeCon@Home on August 19, 2021, Bethesda released a remastered version of Quake for Microsoft Windows, Nintendo Switch, PlayStation 4, PlayStation 5, Xbox One, and Xbox Series X/S consoles, developed by Night Dive Studios. In addition to support for modern systems and improved rendering techniques, the remastered version includes both mission packs, Scourge of Armagon and Dissolution of Eternity. It also includes two episodes created by MachineGames: the previously-released Dimension of the Past and a new one called Dimension of the Machine. A port of Quake 64 was also included in its entirety via the newly-implemented "Add-On" menu.

See also
Diary of a Camper, a short film made in Quake
Binary space partitioning, a technology used in Quake

Notes

References

External links

1996 video games
Acorn Archimedes games
Cancelled Atari Jaguar games
Cancelled Panasonic M2 games
Cancelled PlayStation (console) games
Classic Mac OS games
Commercial video games with freely available source code
Cooperative video games
Cthulhu Mythos video games
Dark fantasy video games
DOS games ported to Windows
DOS games
First-person shooters
Games commercially released with DOSBox
Golden Joystick Award winners
GT Interactive games
1990s horror video games
Id Software games
Id Tech games
Linux games
Lobotomy Software games
MacSoft games
Multiplayer and single-player video games
Multiplayer online games
Nintendo 64 games
Quake (series)
Science fantasy video games
Sega Saturn games
Video games about demons
Video games developed in the United States
Video games scored by Aubrey Hodges
Video games set in antiquity
Video games with expansion packs